Hopewell is an unincorporated community in St. Mary's County, Maryland, United States. It lies at an elevation of seven feet (2 m).

References

Unincorporated communities in St. Mary's County, Maryland
Unincorporated communities in Maryland